Silvija Popović (born 13 March 1986) is a Serbian female professional volleyball player, who was a member of the Serbia women's national volleyball team that won the gold medal at both the 2011 European Championship and the 2018 World Championship.

Career
With her club Rabita Baku Popović won the 2011 FIVB Volleyball Women's Club World Championship.

Popović won the bronze medal at the 2015 FIVB Club World Championship, playing with the Swiss club Voléro Zürich. She also won the tournament's Best Libero award.

Clubs
  Poštar 064 Belgrade (2006–2009)
  Rabita Baku (2009–2012)
  Voléro Zürich (2013–2018)
  Altay VC (2018-present)

Awards

Individual
 2009–10 CEV Cup Final Four "Best libero"
 2015 FIVB Club World Championship "Best Libero"
 2017 FIVB Club World Championship "Best Libero"
 2018 FIVB Volleyball World Championship - European Qualification in Poland "Best Libero"

Clubs
 2011 FIVB Club World Championship -  Champion, with Rabita Baku
 2015 FIVB Club World Championship -  Bronze medal, with Voléro Zürich
 2017 FIVB Club World Championship -  Bronze medal, with Voléro Zürich

References

External links
at FIVB
results and photos - Popović Silvija

1986 births
Living people
Sportspeople from Nikšić
Serbs of Montenegro
Serbian women's volleyball players
Volleyball players at the 2015 European Games
European Games medalists in volleyball
European Games bronze medalists for Serbia
Volleyball players at the 2016 Summer Olympics
Olympic silver medalists for Serbia
Olympic volleyball players of Serbia
Olympic medalists in volleyball
Medalists at the 2016 Summer Olympics
European champions for Serbia
Expatriate volleyball players in Switzerland
Serbian expatriate sportspeople in Azerbaijan
Serbian expatriate sportspeople in Switzerland
Universiade medalists in volleyball
Universiade silver medalists for Serbia
Medalists at the 2009 Summer Universiade
Volleyball players at the 2020 Summer Olympics
Medalists at the 2020 Summer Olympics
Olympic bronze medalists for Serbia